A premium fare is a fare on a public transport service set at least ten percent above the fare normally applying on that route or offered by alternative service - companies or public bodies often using a slower or less commodious vehicle. A premium fare might be levied at times where traffic-levels would otherwise be unbearably high, for instance on summer Fridays or during rush hours, or on a clearly identifiable route where a timely arrival is perceived as particularly important (e.g. reaching a ferry terminal or airport for an onward link for which a high price has already been paid). If the fare level deters some passengers this might reduce vandalism and maintenance costs and minimise the dwell-time required at any intermediate stops between the most popular stops. Many premium fare operations are non-stop (light) railway links and they can therefore abstract considerable capacity from any railway line also used by slower (normally less glamorous) services.

Along congested transport corridors or inner suburbs with lower car ownership levels and typically lower traffic speeds, the adverse impact of fast trains upon other passenger train timetables or parking opportunities raises issues of social equity. Political parties differ widely on whether public transport operations should meet their costs or be viewed partly as a welfare service supporting broader aims of balancing development, life-chances and job opportunities across a city region. Premium fares can thus be viewed as socially divisive, although when applied only to short periods of a working-day they can improve levels of safety and comfort through enticing travellers to spread their journey times. That might have multiplier benefits on personal stress, crime levels and pollution incidence if managed with sensitivity to the public good (rather than simply in pursuance of an operator's profit motive).

Emphasizing the benefits of an off-peak zonal rover ticket at a lower fare than peak-period options over an identical route is one well-tried way of making premium peak-hour fares seem more acceptable, it is an instance of a clever marketing slant. Road tolls as introduced on turnpikes can also be varied by time of day, day of week, or season with identical motives. These can also be market-led or community-determined and might be accrued to repay  loans secured by a firm or transport agency to enable the construction of a bridge, tunnel or high-grade section of road. Again the higher priced option has to be demonstrably better than any alternative route that can be freely driven (excluding running costs of the vehicle).

Wherever a fare is deliberately pitched lower than the norm, this is termed predatory pricing and can lead to antitrust action where regulators have some authority. It is a tactic used to achieve a more monopolistic position in a local 'marketplace', in plain language to squeeze-out an upstart operator, or possibly a well-established one perceived as rather complacent or vulnerable for other reasons (such as poorly remunerated staff).

See also
Commuting
Smart growth
Niche marketing
London Congestion Charge
Road pricing
Pricing

References

Public transport
Pricing